The 19259 / 60 Kochuveli–Bhavnagar Express is an Express train belonging to Indian Railways – Western Railway zone that runs between  and Bhavnagar Terminus in India. From 20 December, 2022, it runs with highly refurbished LHB coaches

It operates as train number 19259 from Kochuveli to Bhavnagar Terminus and as train number 19260 in the reverse direction serving the states of Kerala, Karnataka, Goa, Maharashtra and Gujarat.

Coaches

The 19259 / 60 Kochuveli–Bhavnagar Express has a total of 22 coaches which includes two AC 2 tier, six AC 3 tier, eight Sleeper class, three General Unreserved, one SLR (Seating cum Luggage Rake) Coach, 1 EOG and 1 pantry car.

As is customary with most train services in India, coach composition may be amended at the discretion of Indian Railways depending on demand.

Service

The 19259 Kochuveli–Bhavnagar Terminus Express covers the distance of 2261 km (1,405 mi) in 44 hours 40 mins (50 km/hr) & in 41 hours 50 mins as 19260 Bhavnagar Terminus–Kochuveli Express (54 km/hr).

Routeing

The 19259 / 60 Kochuveli−Bhavnagar Express runs from  via ,
,

Traction
It is hauled by Vadodara Loco Shed-based WAP-7 for its entire journey.

References

External links
12959 Kochuveli Bhavnagar Express at India Rail Info
12960 Bhavnagar Kochuveli Express at India Rail Info

Konkan Railway
Transport in Thiruvananthapuram
Express trains in India
Rail transport in Maharashtra
Rail transport in Goa
Rail transport in Karnataka
Rail transport in Kerala
Railway services introduced in 2011
Rail transport in Gujarat
Transport in Bhavnagar